Elizabeth Lazebnik is a Latvian Canadian filmmaker from Toronto, Ontario, whose full-length feature debut Be Still was released in 2021. The film, which premiered at the 2021 Vancouver International Film Festival, was a Vancouver Film Critics Circle nominee for Best British Columbia Film, and Lazebnik was a nominee for the One to Watch award, at the Vancouver Film Critics Circle Awards 2021.

Prior to Be Still Lazebnik directed a number of short films, the most noted of which, Abeer, was the winner of the Lindalee Tracey Award in 2008.

Filmography
The Multiple Selves of Hannah Maynard - 2005, short
Red Like Meat - 2008, short
Abeer - 2008, short
The Patient - 2011, short
Safe Room - 2012, short
Liompa - 2014, short
Without a Name - 2018, short
I Want to Tell You Something - 2020, short
Be Still - 2021

References

External links

Canadian women film directors
Film directors from Toronto
Living people
Latvian emigrants to Canada
Year of birth missing (living people)